Feliciano López was the defending champion, but lost to Frank Dancevic in the first round.
Kevin Anderson won this tournament. He defeated Somdev Devvarman 4–6, 6–3, 6–2 in the final.

Seeds

Qualifying

Draw

Finals

Top half

Bottom half

References
 Main Draw
 Qualifying Draw

SA Tennis Open - Singles
2011 SA Tennis Open
2011 in South African tennis